The Vineyard Man is a 2006 South Korean television series adapted from Kim Rang's bestselling book.

Synopsis
The story revolves around the life of Lee Ji-hyun (Yoon Eun-hye), a city girl who wants to show the world that beneath her seemingly ordinary characteristics is an extraordinary girl who will someday achieve great things. Ji-hyun is a striving young clothing designer, who hopes to have her own label one day. Her plans are put on hold when she reluctantly takes up a tempting offer from her grand-uncle. She has to work one year in her grand-uncle's vineyard in order to inherit it. In the vineyard, the challenge of adjusting to country life is made more difficult when she has to learn how to grow grapes under the supervision of the seemingly uncouth and unsympathetic man in charge of the vineyard, Jang Taek-gi (Oh Man-seok).

Amidst conflicts and trials, Ji-hyun and Taek-gi learn to care for each other. As time goes by, Ji-hyun finds herself falling in love with the vineyard and the man in it.

Through the mundane process of grape farming and the personal relationship of Ji-hyun and Taek-gi, this story portrays how beauty and kindness can be found in everything and everyone when one looks beyond the surface. Feat

Cast
 Yoon Eun-hye as Lee Ji-hyun  
 Oh Man-seok as Jang Taek-gi 
 Jung So-young as Kang Soo-jin
 Kim Ji-seok as Kim Kyung-min
 Kang Eun-bi as Park Hong-yi
 Lee Soon-jae as Lee Byung-dal
 Bang Eun-hee as Seo Young-ran
 Lee Ji-oh as Lee Myung-gu
 Jang Jung-hee as Lee Jang-daek
 Son Young-choon as village foreman
 Hwang Mi-sun as Han Myung-sook 
 Amanda as Maria
 Kim Chang-wan as Lee Hyung-man
 Lee Mi-young as Choi Ok-sook
 Jo Gyu-chul as Ji-ho
 Ok Ji-young as Moon Eun-young
 Choi Myung-kyung as Park Hong-chul
 Lee Sook as Hong-yi's mother
 Yoon Mun-sik as Park Young-gam
 Sunwoo Yong-nyeo as Song Mal-ja
 Lee Dal-hyung as Oh Young-bae

Awards and nominations
2006 Grimae Awards
Best Actress: Yoon Eun-hye

2006 KBS Drama Awards
Best New Actor: Oh Man-seok
Best New Actress: Yoon Eun-hye
Best Couple: Yoon Eun-hye and Oh Man-seok

2007 Baeksang Arts Awards
Nomination - Best New Actor (TV): Oh Man-seok
Nomination - Best New Director (TV): Park Man-young

References

External links
 The Vineyard Man official KBS website 
 The Man of the Vineyard at KBS Global Marketing
 
 

Korean-language television shows
2006 South Korean television series debuts
2006 South Korean television series endings
Korean Broadcasting System television dramas
South Korean romantic comedy television series
Television series by Kim Jong-hak Production